Raft is a French pop band active in the 1980s, most notable for their 1987 hit single, "Yaka dansé".

Biography
The band was a duet composed of Christian Fourgeron (guitar, vocals) and Pierre Schott (guitar, bass, vocals, born 24 April 1958). They begin their musical career in 1985 with their single "Io (c'est ça)" which passed unnoticed in France. However, in 1987, they had their first hit with "Yaka dansé (l'arborigène)", which was a number 2 hit in France, and earned a gold disc. The single was succeeded by "Femmes du Congo", which achieved a moderate success in comparison. The band's songs contained many puns and dealt with grave themes of society, sung on joyful music. In 1988, they released their first album entitled Madagascar and was the opening act for Niagara's concerts. In 1990, the band split up and both members started a solo career.

More recently, the reformed group participated in the concert tour named RFM Party 80, which started in 2006.

Discography

Raft

Albums
 1985: It's Growing Light
 1989: Madagascar

Singles
 1985: "Io (c'est ça)"
 1987: "Yaka dansé" - #2 in France (gold disc)
 1988: "Femmes du Congo" - #20 in France
 1989: "Didimdam (dimdam)"
 1989: "Sea, Sun and Sensy"
 1990: "Debout gazelles"

Collaborations
 1988: "Dernier Matin d'Asie", a charity single recorded by many artists under the name Sampan

Christian Fourgeron
 1994 : Christian Fourgeron

Pierre Schott
 1992 : Le Nouveau Monde
 1994 : Le Retour à la vie sauvage
 1998 : Le Milieu du grand nulle part
 2007 : Zenland...

References

French musical groups
Musical groups established in 1985
Musical groups disestablished in 1990
French musical duos
1985 establishments in France